Light Rail is a planned urban rail transit in Chennai, India along with other transit systems like Chennai Metro, Chennai Suburban Railway, and  MRTS CMRL announced feasibility of Light Rail between Tambaram and Velachery. Originally, the route was Planned for Chennai Monorail between Vandalur and Velachery. Later it was taken over for Light Rail.

Chennai Light Rail is expected to run on Two corridors

Corridor 1 
Corridor 1 involves the route between Tambaram and Velachery through Selaiyur, Sembakkam, Gowrivakkam, Medavakkam, Pallikaranai and Velachery.

Corridor 2 
Corridor 2 involves the route from Pallavaram to Poonamallee through SH 113A Pallavaram–Kundrathur–Poonamallee Road via Pammal, Anakaputhur, Kundrathur, Mangadu and Kumanan chavadi. It is originally planned as 54 km long Chennai Monorail route between Vandalur and Puzhal. Now it is expected to be taken over for Light Rail between Pallavaram and Poonamallee. The Chennai Light rail is proposed from Pallavaram to Koyambedu via Pammal, Kundrathur, Poonamallee, Ambattur Industrial Estate as per Chennai Comprehensive Transportation Study by Chennai Metropolitan Development Authority.

As per Chennai Comprehensive Mobility Plan, Light Rail runs in Airport - Avadi - Redhills Corridor. The corridor connects Airport with Redhills through Pallavaram, Pammal, Anakaputhur, Kundrathur, Mangadu, Kumananchavadi, Avadi and Redhills.

See also
Chennai Metro

References 

Rail transport in Chennai
Light rail in India